Abettor (from to abet, Old French abeter, à and beter, to bait, urge dogs upon any one; this word is probably of Scandinavian origin, meaning to cause to bite), is a legal term implying one who instigates, encourages or assists another to commit an offence.

An abettor differs from an accessory in that he must be present at the commission of the crime; in addition they are equally guilty as they knowingly and voluntarily assist in the commission of that crime. All abettors (with certain exceptions) are principals, and, in the absence of specific statutory provision to the contrary, are punishable to the same extent as the actual perpetrator of the offence.  A person may in certain cases be convicted as an abettor in the commission of an offence in which he or she could not be a principal, e.g. a woman or boy under fourteen years of age in aiding rape, or a solvent person in aiding and abetting a bankrupt to commit offences against the bankruptcy laws.

More recently, an abettor is generally known as an accomplice.

See also
 Aiding and abetting

References

Criminal law